Dramane may refer to:

 Alassane Dramane Ouattara (born 1942), Ivorian politician
 Aminata Dramane Traoré (born 1942), Malian author, politician, and political activist
 Dramane Coulibaly (born 1979), Malian football player
 Dramane Dembélé, Malian politician
 Dramane Diarra (born 1980), French basketball player
 Dramane Kamaté (born 1985), Malian football player
 Dramane Konaté, (born 1994), Ivorian football player
 Dramane Koné (born 1980), drummer and griot from Burkina Faso
 Dramane Nikièma (born 1988), Burkinabé football player
 Dramane Salou (born 1998), Burkinabé football player
 Dramane Sereme (born 1942), Malian athlete
 Dramane Traoré (born 1982), Malian football player